Air Indus was a private airline based in Karachi operating as a domestic airline. Its headquarters were located in Defence Housing Authority, Karachi. Air Indus started operations on 28 July 2013. However, it was forced to suspend operations on 1 July 2015 after the Civil Aviation Authority suspended its operations as they were not fulfilling the Pakistani legal requirements of three operating aircraft after two aircraft were damaged in a terrorist attack at Karachi Jinnah Airport on July 9, 2014. Its main base of operations and hub was Jinnah International Airport, Karachi.

The airline announced a resumption of operations in January 2016 but never started its operation due to unavailability of aircraft. The airline's remaining aircraft is in a grounded state near Jinnah International Airport's graveyard.

Destinations
Air Indus launched its operations on 28 July 2013, and never fulfilled promise on low fares. Instead, it halted operations on 1 July 2015 due to suspension of its operating license. Former locations served by the airline include:

Frequent flyer program
The Air Indus frequent flyer program was called Indus Miles. The program offered various privileges including priority check-in, priority boarding, priority standby and extra baggage allowance, free award tickets and discounts at various outlets. Indus Miles could be accrued by traveling on Air Indus flights, as well as through partners for booking hotels, renting a car or dining out.

Relaunch
Air Indus has been planning to relaunch operations with new ATR 72 aircraft since the second quarter of 2019. The airline will resume operations to national hubs, and will start operations to the social-economic centres of Pakistan, such as Gwadar, Sukkur, Gilgit and Rahim Yar Khan. The airline also plans to include narrow-body jets for operations to the Middle East.

Fleet 
As of April 2017, the Air Indus fleet's three Boeing 737-300 aircraft are stored on the tarmac of Jinnah International Airport, Karachi. Three other Airbus ATR 72 have been signed by Air Indus.

See also

Portal:Companies/Index by industry/Sub/Transport
List of companies of Pakistan
List of airlines of Pakistan
List of airports in Pakistan
Transport in Pakistan

References

External links 
 
 Air Indus Orders Three Russian Made Aircraft
 Air Indus License Suspended due to Safety Concerns: CAA

Defunct airlines of Pakistan